Anne Floriet (born 1 June 1963) is a successful French paralympic athlete in the Biathlon.

Life
Floriet was born in 1963 and was found to have Ollier disease which is a non hereditary disease that effects bone structure.

Floriet competed at the 1998 and the 2002 Paralympics and as a result was chosen to be the flag bearer at next Paralympics.

In 2006 on the 11 March she won a Paralympic gold medal in the 12.5 km biathlon at the Games in Turin. Floriet also won two bronze medals at the shorter biathlon event and the 10 km skiing event.

References

External links 
 
 

Paralympic gold medalists for France
Paralympic bronze medalists for France
Paralympic cross-country skiers of France
Paralympic biathletes of France
1963 births
Living people
Medalists at the 2006 Winter Paralympics
Medalists at the 1998 Winter Paralympics
French female biathletes
Paralympic medalists in biathlon
Biathletes at the 2006 Winter Paralympics
20th-century French women